The Adderton–Badgett House is a historic house located near Denton, Davidson County, North Carolina.

Description and history 
It was built around 1850, and is a two-story, four bay, log I-house. It has a gable roof, exterior end chimneys, and sits on a fieldstone pier foundation.

It was added to the National Register of Historic Places on July 10, 1984.

References

Log houses in the United States
Houses on the National Register of Historic Places in North Carolina
Houses completed in 1850
Houses in Davidson County, North Carolina
National Register of Historic Places in Davidson County, North Carolina
Log buildings and structures on the National Register of Historic Places in North Carolina
I-houses in North Carolina